In the Shadow of the Silent Majorities, Or, the End of the Social is a 1978 philosophical treatise by Jean Baudrillard, in which he analyzes the masses and their relation to meaning. Baudrillard praises the masses for their resistance to the mass media and 'the social', for their "direct defiance of the political" and for "victoriously resist[ing] the media by diverting or absorbing all the messages which it produces without responding to them".

Publication history 

The first edition of the book was published in the final issue of the magazine Les Cahiers d'Utopie in 1978. It was translated to English by Paul Foss, John Johnston and Paul Patton, and published by the Foreign Agents imprint of Semiotext(e) in 1983. A second edition was published in 2007.

Main ideas 

In the 1970s, magazines such as Utopie, Noir et rouge, ICO, Socialisme ou Barbarie, Pouvoir ouvrier, and the Situationists were unconditionally opposed to the official culture. They saw the masses as hypnotized into submission by a "society of the spectacle." However, Baudrillard interpreted the passivity of the masses in a different way.

The work starts with the idea that meaning has been devalued. "For a long time, capital had only to produce goods; consumption ran by itself... Today it is necessary to produce consumers, to produce demand, and this production is infinitely more costly than that of goods." The same applies to meaning. "Today, everything has changed; no longer is meaning in short supply, it is produced everywhere, in ever increasing quantities – it is demand which is weakening... Everywhere the masses are encouraged to speak... They are urged to live socially, electorally, organizationally, sexually, in participation, in festival, in free speech, etc."

The central point of the book is that the masses actively refuse meaning. It is an explicit break with sociology. While modernity laments the ignorance of the docile masses, Baudrillard argues that the indifference of the masses to political events, history, art, and culture, is actually "a collective retaliation" and "a refusal to participate in the recommended ideals, however enlightened." All the masses can do - and all they will do - is enjoy the spectacle.

Since "their representation is no longer possible," the masses are probed by means of surveys, polls, and tests. Politics is forced to rely on simulations of the people as a substitute. Masses are "far too conforming to every solicitation and with a hyperreal conformity which is the extreme form of non-participation." As Baudrillard stated in a later interview: "People do in fact defend themselves, they have their defensive and even offensive strategies; but this time, through indifference."

See also
 Spectacle (critical theory)
 Silent majority

References 

1978 non-fiction books
Books about hyperreality
Books by Jean Baudrillard
French non-fiction books
Metaphysics books
Works about postmodernism
Semiotext(e) books